John Edward Jones may refer to:

 John Edward Jones (sculptor) (1806–1862), Irish civil engineer and sculptor
 John E. Jones III (born 1955), American lawyer
 John Edward Jones (governor) (1840–1896), American politician
 John Edward Jones (Welsh politician) (1905–1970), Welsh political organiser
 John Edward Jones (died 2009), caver who died in the Nutty Putty Cave

See also
John Jones (disambiguation)